Tom Comyns (born 26 June 1973) is an Irish former sprinter who is now a lecturer at the University of Limerick. He competed in the men's 4 × 100 metres relay at the 2000 Summer Olympics.

References

External links
 

1973 births
Living people
Athletes (track and field) at the 2000 Summer Olympics
Irish male sprinters
Olympic athletes of Ireland
Place of birth missing (living people)